Adam Connelly (born 28 April 1979) is an Australian former rugby league footballer who played for the North Queensland Cowboys in the National Rugby League. He primarily played .

Background
A Norths Ipswich junior, Connelly attended Ipswich Grammar School, where he played rugby union and was selected for the Australian under-16 side before being signed by the North Queensland Cowboys.

Playing career
In 1998, while contracted to the Cowboys, Connelly played for the Townsville Stingers in the Queensland Cup.

In Round 9 of the 1999 NRL season, Connelly made his NRL debut, starting on the wing and scoring a try in the Cowboys' 20–14 win over the Balmain Tigers at Dairy Farmers Stadium. He finished his debut season having played eight games, scoring three tries, and playing predominantly for the Cairns Cyclones. In 2000, he played 11 games for the Cowboys, scoring four tries, primarily playing on the wing. In 2001, his final season with the club, he played seven games. After leaving the Cowboys, Connelly switched to rugby union, playing for the ACT Griffins and trialling with the ACT Brumbies.

In 2004, Connelly played for the Ipswich Jets in the Queensland Cup before again switching to rugby union at the end of the season, where he played for the University of Queensland Rugby Club.

Statistics

NRL
 Statistics are correct to the end of the 2001 season

References

1979 births
Living people
Australian rugby league players
Ipswich Jets players
North Queensland Cowboys players
Rugby league players from Ipswich, Queensland
Rugby league wingers